Valiabad (also Romanized as Valīābād; also known as Valehzīr) is a village in Dasht Rural District, in the Central District of Meshgin Shahr County, Ardabil Province, Iran. At the 2006 census, its population was 223, in 46 families.

References 

Towns and villages in Meshgin Shahr County